The Bright Lights of America is the seventh studio album released by Anti-Flag on April 1, 2008. Much of the album was released on the band's MySpace with twelve of the thirteen tracks on March 24, 2008. This album was different from the previous one; it was the first to feature a string section and child choirs.

Singles and videos
The first song released from the album was "Good 'N' Ready", featured on Fat Wreck Chords Hanuk-Comp From the Dreidel to the Grave compilation.

In April 2008 Anti-Flag teamed up with Rage Against the Machine guitarist Tom Morello and a host of roller derby girls for a video for "The Bright Lights of America". "The video demonstrates the audacity and the craziness of the seemingly endless war... We're trying to get that across in a funny and interesting way. In the video there are different teams that represent various places in the world and various nationalities. Team USA comes out and plays dirty and wipes the floor with everyone. Throughout all that you have Tom Morello as the coach of Team USA - he's a fiery coach and he's out for blood! He gets the ladies to perform at their peak!", bassist Chris #2 told Kerrang!. The Los Angeles Roller Derby team and a group of fans took part in the 20-hour show, with many suffering on-set injuries; one girl sprained her knee, another broke her collar-bone, according to the magazine.

Track listing

Personnel

Anti-Flag
Justin Sane – Lead vocals, lead guitar
Chris #2 – Lead vocals, bass 
Chris Head – Rhythm guitar, backing vocals
Pat Thetic – Drums, percussion

Artwork
Robert Larson – Album Artwork, album design

Additional musicians
Benjamin Kowalewicz - additional vocals on "Wake Up the Town"
Benjamin Karp – Cello
Patrick Binford – Cello

Production
Tony Visconti – Producer, mixing, percussion
Matt Marshall – A&R
Mass Giorgini – Mastering - LP format
Emily Lazar – Mastering - CD format
Mario J. McNulty – Engineer, percussion 
Joe LaPorta  – Mastering Assistant
Tim Price  – Assistant Engineer

Charts

References

Anti-Flag albums
2008 albums